The John D. Dingell Transit Center is an intermodal transit station in Dearborn, Michigan. It is served by Amtrak's Wolverine line as well as Suburban Mobility Authority for Regional Transportation (SMART) buses. The station is named after former U.S. Representative John Dingell.

Description 
The station is located at 21201 Michigan Avenue (US Highway 12). The red brick and glass-faced structure includes a two-story waiting hall, which includes an elevated glass-enclosed pedestrian bridge which allows access to the south platform.  There is also a small retail space within the station.

History 

The station was established in 1978 with the goal of Detroit's western suburban residents' access to passenger trains. A station with a temporary structure opened July 30, 1978.  A permanent station building opened on October 1, 1979, replacing the temporary structure. The station was built on property deeded to the city by the Ford Motor Company. The construction cost $348,000, which was split between Amtrak and the state of Michigan. It was of an Amtrak standard station design.

On 19 August 2011, it was announced that the Federal Railroad Administration had released $28.2 million in funds from the ARRA economic stimulus package for the construction of a new intermodal station to replace the current building; the new facility would serve both intercity and commuter rail and include a new entrance to The Henry Ford museum complex adjacent to it.

The new 16,000-square-foot station was officially opened for service on 10 December 2014, and consolidates the old station and the Greenfield Village station.

Connections
Suburban Mobility Authority for Regional Transportation; Routes 140, 160, 200, 210, 250, and FAST 261.  SMART's on-demand Flex service also serves the station and the surrounding area.

See Also 
Other stations that recently were demolished and replaced with a newer building.

 Schenectady station
 Rochester, station
 Buffalo–Exchange Street station
 Niagara Falls station (New York)
 Anaheim station
 Bloomington-Normal station
 Tacoma station/Tacoma Dome station

References

External links

Dearborn Amtrak Station (USA Rail Guide -- Train Web)

Amtrak stations in Michigan
Buildings and structures in Dearborn, Michigan
Transportation buildings and structures in Wayne County, Michigan
Railway stations in the United States opened in 2014
Michigan Line
2014 establishments in Michigan